Edward Ettore "Ed" Annunziata is best known for the Ecco the Dolphin series, Kolibri for the Sega 32X. and as the voice of "Greg" in the Sega Saturn game Three Dirty Dwarves. Later he served as an Executive Producer for Nokia's N-Gage mobile phone and gaming device, helping create nearly a dozen multiplayer titles for the platform. One of them, Smallball Baseball, was one of the first microtransactions-based games targeting the US market. In 2006, he founded Twofish, Inc. (now part of Live Gamer) with Lee Crawford and Sean Ryan.

Games
Spider-Man (1990, Sega Genesis)
Chakan: The Forever Man (1992, Sega Genesis)
Dungeons & Dragons: Warriors of the Eternal Sun (1992, Sega Genesis)
Ecco the Dolphin (1992, Sega Genesis)
Cyborg Justice (1993, Sega Genesis) 
Jurassic Park (1993, Sega CD)
Ecco: The Tides of Time (1994, Sega Genesis)
Ecco Jr. (1995, Sega Genesis)
Vectorman (1995, Sega Genesis)
The Adventures of Batman and Robin (1995, Sega Genesis)
Kolibri (1995, Sega 32X)
Mr. Bones (1996, Sega Saturn)
Three Dirty Dwarves (1996, Sega Saturn)
Tiny Tank: Up Your Arsenal (1999, PlayStation)
Mort the Chicken (2000, PlayStation)
SmallBall Baseball (2000)
SEGA Smashpack (2002, Game Boy Advance)
SNAP Mobile Soccer (2005)
Slice HD (2011, TwitchGame, LLC)

References

External links
E. Ettore Annunziata on MobyGames
Twofish
SmallBall Baseball

Year of birth missing (living people)
Living people
Video game producers